George Parsons may refer to:

 George Parsons (shipbuilder) (died 1812), prolific shipbuilder in Bursledon, Hampshire
 George Parsons (rugby) (1926–2009), Welsh dual-code international rugby union and professional rugby league footballer
 George Parsons (ice hockey) (1914–1998), professional ice hockey player 
 George W. Parsons (1850–1933), attorney turned banker during the 19th century Old West
 George Parsons (photographer), born 1845, American photographer
 George Parsons (sailor) (1911–?), Canadian sailor
 George Mesnard Parsons (1890–1963), English brewer